In open systems, a virtual terminal (VT) is an application service that:

 Allows host terminals on a multi-user network to interact with other hosts regardless of terminal type and characteristics,
 Allows remote log-on by local area network managers for the purpose of management,
 Allows users to access information from another host processor for transaction processing,
 Serves as a backup facility.

PuTTY is an example of a virtual terminal.

ITU-T defines a virtual terminal protocol based on the OSI application layer protocols. However, the virtual terminal protocol is not widely used on the Internet.

See also
 Pseudo terminal for the software interface that provides access to virtual terminals
 Secure Shell
 Telnet
 Terminal emulator for an application program that provides access to virtual terminals
 Virtual console for an analogous concept that provides several local consoles

Sources

Computer terminals
ITU-T recommendations